Julognathus is an extinct genus of therocephalian in the family Scylacosauridae. It is known from a single species, Julognathus crudelis, from the Middle Permian of Russia.

References 

Scylacosaurids